Gustavo Rojas (born 28 September 1967) is an Argentine professional golfer.

Rojas was born in Buenos Aires. He turned professional in 1984. He has had his greatest success in South America on the various Argentine tours and the regional Tour de las Américas. In 2002, he was tied with Ángel Cabrera in the Argentine PGA Championship after 54 holes, but torrential rain meant that the final round was cancelled and the two shared the title.

Rojas has played on the European Tour and its development tour, the Challenge Tour, since 1999. He has struggled to establish himself at the highest level, and has often had to return to the tours qualifying school. His best tournament finishes on the elite tour have been a pair of joint 5th places at the 2000 BMW International Open and the 2001 Via Digital Open de España. On the Challenge Tour he has enjoyed more success, winning the Open dei Tessali in 1999 and having several runners-up finishes, including three losses in playoffs. He ended the 1999 season in 4th place on the Challenge Tour Rankings to graduate to the European Tour for the 2000 season, when he again failed to secure his card. Since 2004 he has competed predominantly on the Challenge Tour.

Professional wins (14)

Challenge Tour wins (1)

Challenge Tour playoff record (0–3)

Asia Golf Circuit wins (1)
1995 Indian Tournament

Argentine wins (6)
1990 Golfers Grand Prix
1995 North Open
1999 Santiago del Estero Open, Ranelagh Open
2000 Olivos Grand Prix
2002 Argentine PGA Championship (tie with Ángel Cabrera)

South American wins (6)
1996 Ecuador Open
1997 Ecuador Open, Marbella Open (Chile), Los Leones Open (Chile)
1998 Marbella Open (Chile)
2006 Posada de la Concepción Open (Chile)

References

External links

Argentine male golfers
European Tour golfers
Sportspeople from Buenos Aires
1967 births
Living people